The Erzbischöfliche Liebfrauenschule Bonn, often referred to as the Liebfrauenschule Bonn, is a Roman Catholic gymnasium school for girls in the Südstadt quarter of Bonn, North Rhine-Westfalia, Germany.

History 
In 1876, a private Catholic school for girls was founded by Bernardine Fröhlich and from 1900 was run by Emilie Heyermann. It was located in Clemensstraße and had c. 250 pupils. In 1917, it was taken over by the School Sisters of Notre Dame, and in 1919 it moved to Königstraße 17–19. From 1938 to 1944, it was closed and replaced by a städtische Oberschule II für Mädchen. In 1945, the Sisters took over the school again and converted it into a gymnasium for modern languages and, until 1975, for high school education for women. In 1975, the Roman Catholic Archdiocese of Cologne took over responsibility for the school. In 1985, it was renovated and the buildings were extended.

Building 
The main building of the school is a listed building from the Gründerzeit.

Notable alumnae 
Annika Beck, tennis player
Laura Herz, Professor of Physics

See also 

 Education in Germany
 List of schools in Germany
 Catholic Church in Germany

References

Further reading

External links 
 Erzbischöfliche Liebfrauenschule Bonn

Schools in North Rhine-Westphalia
Girls' schools in Germany
Gymnasiums in Germany
Catholic secondary schools in Germany
Educational institutions established in 1917
1917 establishments in Germany
School Sisters of Notre Dame schools